Jesús Manuel Montané Juvillà (Barcelona, 1972) is a film director, writer and journalist. He has done music videos (Begging The Waves, for Lídia Pujol), animated movies such as 2.0 (1998) and Godspeed: One: Secret Legacy (2008), and the live-action feature-length movie Ushima-Next (2011), featuring author Fernando Arrabal. It premiered at the Noves Visions Section of the Festival Internacional de Cine Fantástico de Sitges. Montané is a member of the Colegio Profesional del Audiovisual de Catalunya (CPAC), and a founding member of the production company Grupo Estudio.

References

 Ushima-Next's listing in the official Sitges Film Festival web site
 Jesús Manuel Montané's listing in Catalan Films & TV
 An article in El Punt (in Catalan)

External links

1972 births
Spanish film directors
Spanish film producers
Spanish male writers
Living people
People from Barcelona